Tha Muen Ram is a sub-district in the Wang Thong District of Phitsanulok Province, Thailand.

Geography
Tha Muen Ram lies in the Nan Basin, part of the Chao Phraya Watershed.

Administration
The following is a list of the sub-district's muban, which roughly correspond to villages:

References

Tambon of Phitsanulok province
Populated places in Phitsanulok province